Yuri de Jesus Messias (born 11 September 1991), commonly known as Yuri, is a Brazilian footballer who currently plays for Bahraini club East Riffa.

Career statistics

Club

Notes

References

1991 births
Living people
Brazilian footballers
Brazilian expatriate footballers
Association football forwards
Boavista Sport Club players
Mosta F.C. players
Msida Saint-Joseph F.C. players
Naxxar Lions F.C. players
Nadur Youngsters F.C. players
Al-Jabalain FC players
Valletta F.C. players
Gudja United F.C. players
East Riffa Club players
Saudi First Division League players
Maltese Premier League players
Brazilian expatriate sportspeople in Malta
Brazilian expatriate sportspeople in Saudi Arabia
Brazilian expatriate sportspeople in Bahrain
Expatriate footballers in Malta
Expatriate footballers in Saudi Arabia
Expatriate footballers in Bahrain
Footballers from Rio de Janeiro (city)